Lindome is a civil parish and a locality situated in Mölndal Municipality, Västra Götaland County, Sweden with 13,830 inhabitants in the parish in 2009 (11,037 inhabitants in the locality in 2010). The Swedish comic creator Rune Andreasson was born in this small town 1925.

Points of interest 
In Lindome there is the static inverter plant of the Konti-Skan HVDC system. On the area of the static inverter plant, there is also a 120.1 metres tall guyed mast, which carries antennas for transmitting telecommands for controlling the Konti-Skan system towards Denmark.

Sports
The following sports clubs are located in Lindome:

 Lindome GIF
 Lindome BTK
 Lindome IBK

References

External links

Populated places in Västra Götaland County
Populated places in Mölndal Municipality